Chiltern Radio Network (also known as Chiltern Radio Group) was the parent group of several independent local radio stations in the 1980s and 1990s. These were divided across two networks: The Hot FM and SuperGold.

History
Chiltern Radio launched 15 October 1981 from studios located on Chiltern Road in Dunstable, Bedfordshire. On 1 June 1982, Chiltern expanded into Bedford with studios on Goldington Road. This was joined 30 November 1986 with Northants Radio from Northampton, and 15 October 1989 with Horizon Radio from Milton Keynes. The Hot FM network transmitted on the FM services of 97.6 Chiltern FM, 96.9 Chiltern FM, Northants 96, Horizon Radio, followed later by Oasis Radio, Severn Sound, and Galaxy Radio. For a while Galaxy Radio and Horizon Radio operated a slightly more edgy "Hotter Mix" format, although switched back again to the "Hot FM" for networked programming. Supergold transmitted on the AM services of Chiltern Radio, Northants Radio, followed later by Severn Sound and Invicta Radio.

Stations would broadcast from their own studios until 7pm, then share programmes from Dunstable overnight.

In 1994, the GWR Group acquired the network, and began re-branding the stations in September 1995 - the FM stations as part of their Mix Network and gold stations as  Classic Gold Digital Network. Shared programming moved to Bristol. In May 2005, the GWR Group merged with Capital Radio to form GCap Media, which was further bought out by Global Radio in 2008, and eventually became the Heart Radio network.

Presenters

Original DJs and presenters included Paul McKenna, Paul 'Mad Dog' O'Reilly, Martin Collins, Tony West, NJ Williams, Tony Lloyd, and Louie Martin. Networked presenters included Graham Torrington, Chris Moyles, Emma Scott, Steve Power, Tim Allen, Tom Stewart, Simon Clarke, Neale James, Treva Ellis, and Laura Penn. Other presenters included Paul Garner who did a comedy and unsigned music show, David Francis on the late show and Dave Sanders who hosted a Sunday show consisting of mostly album tracks.

Network news
Chiltern Radio Network ran the satellite news service Network News between 5 July 1991 and 1 April 1996 as a competitor to Independent Radio News. The service provided hourly national news bulletins to not only Chiltern stations, but other broadcasters including Virgin Radio, Radio Luxembourg, Choice FM, and Radio Maldwyn. Network News was joint led by Paul Chantler (then Group Programme Director of the Chiltern Radio Network) and Jon Davies, journalist who had been a key part of ITN Radio News. The service closed with the acquisition of Chiltern Radio by the GWR Group, which was a shareholder in IRN.

References

External links
 Chiltern Radio - The Legacy Site - historical information, photos & audio

Defunct radio stations in the United Kingdom
Former British radio networks
Radio broadcasting companies of the United Kingdom
News agencies based in the United Kingdom
1981 establishments in the United Kingdom
Companies established in 1981
1994 mergers and acquisitions